First Solar, Inc. is an American manufacturer of solar panels, and a provider of utility-scale PV power plants and supporting services that include finance, construction, maintenance and end-of-life panel recycling. First Solar uses rigid thin-film modules for its solar panels, and produces CdTe panels using cadmium telluride (CdTe) as a semiconductor. 
The company was founded in 1990 by inventor Harold McMaster as Solar Cells, Inc. and the Florida Corporation in 1993 with JD Polk. In 1999 it was purchased by True North Partners, LLC, who rebranded it as First Solar, Inc. 

The company went public in 2006, trading on the NASDAQ. Its current chief executive is Mark Widmar, who succeeded the previous CEO James Hughes July 1, 2016.  First Solar is based in Tempe, Arizona.

In 2009, First Solar became the first solar panel manufacturing company to lower its manufacturing cost to $1 per watt. As of 2010, First Solar was considered the second-largest maker of PV modules worldwide and ranked sixth in Fast Companys list of the world's 50 most innovative companies.

In 2011, it ranked first on Forbes's list of America's 25 fastest-growing technology companies. It is listed on the Photovoltaik Global 30 Index since the beginning of this stock index in 2009. The company was also listed as No. 1 in Solar Power World magazine's 2012 and 2013 rankings of solar contractors.

 Technology 
First Solar manufactures cadmium telluride (CdTe)-based photovoltaic (PV) modules, which produce electricity with a thin CdTe film on glass.

In 2013, the company produced CdTe-panels with an efficiency of about 14 percent at a reported cost of 59 cents per watt. In August 2019, researchers from NREL and First Solar published a Nature Energy article demonstrating a way to achieve 20.8% solar cell efficiency.

 History 
In 1984, inventor and entrepreneur Harold McMaster founded Glasstech Solar. After trying amorphous silicon, he shifted to CdTe and founded Solar Cells, Inc. (SCI) in 1990. In February 1999, SCI was acquired by True North Partners, which then formed First Solar, LLC'.

At the end of 2009, First Solar had surpassed an energy power production rate of 1 GW and was the largest producer of PV cells in the world.

The company is headquartered in Tempe, Arizona and has manufacturing facilities in Perrysburg, Ohio and Kulim, Malaysia.

In July 2010, First Solar formed a utility systems business group to address the large-scale PV systems solutions market. Utility systems are now the company's core business focus, with a strategy to focus on markets that do not require subsidies to support the solar generation business.

On April 17, 2012, First Solar announced it would restructure operations worldwide. This restructuring process included phasing out operations in Frankfurt (Oder), Germany and idling four production lines in Kulim, Malaysia. 30% of First Solar's workforce was laid off as a result of these actions, which were blamed on market volatility and reduced demand. Mark Widmar, the CFO of First Solar, said, "We need to resize our business to a level of demand that is highly reliable and predictable."

On July 1, 2016, Mark Widmar was appointed CEO of First Solar. Previously he had been chief financial officer. Company founder and former CEO Mike Ahearn remains chairman of the board.

Market history 
Historically, First Solar sold its products to solar project developers, system integrators, and independent power producers. Early sales were primarily in Germany because of strong incentives for solar enacted in the German Renewable Energy Sources Act (EEG) of 2000 (cp. Solar power in Germany). Declines and uncertainty in feed-in-tariff subsidies for solar power in European markets, including Germany, France, Italy and Spain, prompted major PV manufacturers, such as First Solar, to accelerate their expansion into other markets, including the U.S., India and China.

Beginning in December 2011, First Solar shifted away from existing markets that are heavily dependent on government subsidies and toward providing utility-scale PV systems in sustainable markets with immediate need. As a result, it now competes against conventional power generators, and has reduced its focus on the rooftop market.

On February 24, 2009, First Solar's cost per watt broke the $1 barrier, reaching $0.98. Production cost has continued to fall and in February 2013, reached $0.68 per watt.

Production history 
In 2019, the company was expected to pass annual shipments of panels for 5,400 MWp. Production started in Perrysburg, Ohio, expanded in 2010. Between 2007 and 2012, production grew in additional plants in Frankfurt (Oder) in Germany, in Kulim Hi-Tech Park in Malaysia and in France. Other locations considered for expansions before 2012 were Vietnam and Mesa, AZ.

Market performance 
While First Solar witnessed record sales of over $3.37 billion in 2012, its restructuring efforts impacted the bottom line, leading to a net loss of $96.3 million – or $1.11 per share – for the year.

Historically, the low cost of First Solar's modules has been the key to its market performance. The use of cadmium telluride instead of silicon allowed it to achieve a significantly lower module cost ($0.67 per watt), compared to crystalline-silicon PV, which averaged $1.85 per watt in 2010.

As the company shifts its focus away from module sales to utility-scale projects, it will need to become price competitive with non-solar power sources, a move which its executives say will require the company to reduce manufacturing costs and optimize efficiency.

Installations 
First Solar had installed 1,505 MW of solar capacity as of 2012. As of 2019, First Solar has over 17GW deployed globally. Below are some of First Solar's solar installations and development projects:

North America
802 MW Copper Mountain Solar Facility near Boulder City, NV, constructed in 5 phases for Sempra Energy and Consolidated Edison.
550 MW Topaz Solar Farm in San Luis Obispo County, CA, acquired by MidAmerican Energy Holdings.
550 MW Desert Sunlight Solar Farm in Riverside County, CA, acquired by NextEra Energy and GE Energy Financial Services.
290 MW Agua Caliente Solar Project in Yuma County, AZ, constructed for NRG Energy and MidAmerican Renewables.
230 MW Antelope Valley Solar Ranch in Los Angeles, CA, completed 2014 and acquired by Exelon Corp.
80 MW Sarnia Solar Farm in Ontario, Canada, completed, owned by Enbridge.
50 MW Silver State North Solar Project, in Boulder County, NV, completed, acquired by Enbridge.

Europe, Middle East, and North Africa

Mohammed bin Rashid Al Maktoum Solar Park in Saih Al-Dahal, UAE, includes a 13 MWDC solar power plant built by First Solar for the Dubai Electricity & Water Authority (DEWA).
Stadtwerke Trier (SWT) in Trier, Germany, is one of the world's largest thin-film solar plants. As of February 2009, it was estimated the facility would produce over 9 GWh per year, which would supply power to more than 2,400 homes each year.
The Ramat Hovav solar field is the largest PV power plant built so far in Israel's solar power sector. Constructed by Belectric over a previous evaporation pond, it has a nominal capacity of 37.5 MW. The facility became fully operational in December 2014.
Waldpolenz Solar Park near Leipzig, Germany, was built and developed by Juwi Group, and has a capacity of 40 MW. The facility became fully operational in 2008.
In December 2009, the Lieberose Photovoltaic Park, Germany's biggest conversion land project (126 hectares) on a former military training area, was opened with an output of 53 MW. The solar park uses 700,000 solar modules.
For the Sports Stadium Bentegodi in Verona, Italy, First Solar supplied more than 13,000 thin film modules for a rooftop installation.

Asia and Australia
10 MW Greenough River Solar Farm in Western Australia, completed for Verve Energy and GE Energy Financial Services.
159 MW AGL Energy projects, to be constructed in Nyngan and Broken Hill, New South Wales. The 53 MW Broken Hill project was completed in 2015.

See also
Thin film solar cell
Cadmium telluride photovoltaics
Copper indium gallium selenide (CIGS)
Photovoltaic power stations
SolarCity 
Solar power in Germany
5N Plus Inc.

References

External links

Manufacturing companies based in Phoenix, Arizona
Solar energy companies of the United States
Photovoltaics manufacturers
Thin-film cell manufacturers
Manufacturing companies established in 1999
Companies listed on the Nasdaq
1999 establishments in Arizona
2006 initial public offerings
Walton family
American companies established in 1999
American brands